TELUS Health, a division of TELUS Corporation, is a Vancouver, Canada-based provider of health technology services with more than 10,000 employees primarily located in Canada, United States, Australia and the United Kingdom. The company operates four customer-facing business units: Employer Solutions, Consumer Solutions, Payor Solutions (insurers) and Provider Solutions (health care professionals, health institutions and governments).  

The company’s operations are global, with products and services that cover more than 50 million employees of organizations in 160 countries  plus more than 130,000 physicians, pharmacies and allied health professionals in Canada. It also supports the processing of roughly 130 million health insurance claims electronically each year on behalf of insurers.

Background

MPact Immedia—established in 1988—merged with Bell Canada's Electronic Business Solutions to form BCE Emergis in 1998, which became an independent unit on May 6, 2006. On December 1, 2004, the company was renamed as Emergis.

In 2007, TELUS Corp purchased Emergis for $763 million.

Shortly after acquiring Emergis, TELUS introduced its TELUS Health Solutions division. In June 2022, TELUS Health acquired LifeWorks, in a deal valued at valued at $2.9 billion including debt.

Locations 
TELUS Health has office locations in Quebec, Ontario, Alberta, and British Columbia.

The company also has 14 TELUS Health Care Centres in British Columbia, Alberta, Manitoba, Ontario, Quebec and Newfoundland and Labrador and 4 TELUS Health MyCare Clinics located in British Columbia and Quebec. 

TELUS Health Virtual Pharmacy has dispensing locations in British Columbia, Manitoba and Ontario.

References

Technology companies of Canada
Companies based in Montreal
Telus